Marchioness of Reading may refer to:

Alice Isaacs, Marchioness of Reading (c.1866–1930), first wife of the 1st Marquess
Stella Isaacs, Marchioness of Reading (1894–1971), second wife of the 1st Marquess
Eva Violet Mond, Marchioness of Reading (1895–1973), wife of the 2nd Marques
Margot Rufus Isaacs, Marchioness of Reading (1919–2015), wife of the 3rd Marquess
Melinda Victoria Dewar, Marchioness of Reading (fl. 1979–1986), wife of the fourth Marquess

See also
Reading (disambiguation)